The following is a list of Trotskyist organizations by country. This article lists only those currently existing parties which self-identify ideologically as Trotskyist. Included are Trotskyist factions, but not youth organizations or party alliances.

List
 – Socialist Workers Party, Workers' Party
 – Movement for Socialism, Socialist Left, Socialist Workers' Party, United Socialist Workers' Party, Workers' Left Front, Workers' Party, Workers' Socialist Movement
 – Socialist Alternative, Socialist Equality Party, Socialist Action, Solidarity, Spartacist League, Workers' Liberty Australia, Freedom Socialist Party
 – Left Turn, Socialist Left Party, The Spark, Workers Viewpoint
 – HAQİQAT
 – Communist Party of Bangladesh (Marxist–Leninist) (Section of the Fourth International)
 - International Workers' League, Left Socialist Party, Anticapitalist Left
 – Revolutionary Socialist Alternative, Revolutionary Worker League – Fourth International, Revolutionary Workers Party, Workers' Socialist Movement
 – International Socialist Organization
 – Freedom, Socialism and Revolution, Revolts, Revolutionary Workers' Movement, Socialist Democracy, Socialist Workers' Current, United Socialist Workers' Party, Workers' Cause Party
 – International Socialists, Socialist Action, Socialist Alternative,  Socialist Fightback, Trotskyist League in Quebec and Canada
 – Socialist Alternative, Socialist Left,  La Riposte Socialiste
 –  China Worker
 – Revolutionary Communist Party of China (October Review), Socialist Action
 – Revolutionary Workers Party, Movimiento Anticapitalista, Anticapitalist Workers' Left
 – Presents for Socialism
 – New Socialist Party, Socialist Organization, Workers' Party
 – New Internationalist Left, Workers' Democracy
 – Marxist Alternative, Socialist Alternative Future, Socialist Organisation of Working People, Socialist Solidarity,
 – International Socialists, Socialist Workers Party, Revolutionary Socialists (IMT)
 – Revolutionary Socialists
 – Marxist Workers' League, Socialist Alternative
 – Independent Workers' Party, Revolutionary Left, Trotskyist League of France, Workers' Struggle, New Anticapitalist Party
 – International Socialist Left, Revolutionary Internationalist Organisation, Revolutionary Socialist League, Socialist Equality Party, Socialist Alternative, Socialist Organisation 'Solidarity', The Spark, Workers' Power, Spartakist-Arbeiterpartei
 – International Socialist Organisation
 – Internationalist Workers' Left, Organisation of Internationalist Communists of Greece, Organization of Communist Internationalists of Greece–Spartacus, Socialist Workers' Party, Start – Socialist Internationalist Organisation, Trotskyist Group of Greece, Workers Revolutionary Party
 – Radical Socialist, New Socialist Alternative, Workers' Socialist Party
 - Acoma Party, Perhimpunan Sosialis Revolusioner
 – Socialist Workers' Party of Iran
 – People Before Profit, Solidarity, Socialist Party, Socialist Workers Network, Workers Power, Militant Left, Socialist Democracy
 and  – Socialist Struggle Movement
 – Left Classe Revolution, Workers' Communist Party, Communist Alternative Party, Anticapitalist Left
 – Militant Côte d'Ivoire 
 – Japan Revolutionary Communist League, Spartacist Group Japan, Japan Revolutionary Communist League (Revolutionary Marxist Faction)
 – Workers' Solidarity, Bolshevik Group, Movement Towards Socialism
 – Revolutionary Communist Group
 - Socialist Alternative
 – Anticapitalist Workers' Left, Socialist Workers Movement
 – Socialist Alternative Politics, Socialist Alternative, International Socialists, Vonk (International Marxist Tendency)
 – International Socialist Organisation, Socialist Voice, Socialist Aotearoa
 – Workers' Revolutionary Party
 – Democratic Socialist Movement, Movement for a Socialist Alternative
 – Internationalist League of Norway, International Socialists
 – Socialist Movement Pakistan, The Struggle Pakistan
 - Workers Party (Marxist–Leninist)
 – Workers' Party
 – Workers' Revolutionary Party, Socialist Workers Party, Socialist Workers Party (1992)
 – Polish Labour Party - August 80, Socialist Alternative, Workers' Democracy
 – Revolutionary Socialism, Socialist Alternative Movement, Workers' Party of Socialist Unity
 – Hand of Labour
 – Marxist Tendency, Revolutionary Workers' Party, Russian Socialist Movement, Socialist Alternative, Socialist Tendency
 – Spartacist South Africa, Workers and Socialist Party, Workers International Vanguard Party, Keep Left, African Peoples' Democratic Union of Southern Africa, International Socialist Movement, Non-European Unity Movement
 – Revolutionary Workers' Party, Internationalist Struggle, In Struggle, Red Current, Workers' Revolutionary Current, Revolutionary Left, Revolutionary Socialism, Anticapitalistas, Internationalist Socialist Workers' Party, Revolutionary Anticapitalist Left
 – Stand up
 – Lanka Equal Society Party, Lanka Equal Society Party (Alternative Group), New Equal Society Party, United Socialist Party, Socialist Party of Sri Lanka, Socialist Equality Party, Revolutionary Workers Party
 – Socialist Alternative
 – Socialist Party, Socialist Justice Party, International Socialists, Workers' Power
 – Solidarity, The Spark
 - International Socialist Forward
 – Workers Democracy Group
 – Workers' Party
 – Socialist Alternative, Workers' Left League
 – Revolutionary Workers' Party, Revolutionary Socialist Workers' Party, New Way, Socialist Alternative, Workers' Fraternity Party
 – Alliance for Workers' Liberty, Communist League, International Socialist League, Workers' Power, Socialist Action, Socialist Appeal, Socialist Equality Party, Socialist Resistance, Socialist Workers' Party, Spartacist League, Workers' Fight, Workers International to Rebuild the Fourth International, Workers Revolutionary Party, Socialist Alternative, Socialist Alternative
 and  – Socialist Party
 – Socialist Party Scotland, Solidarity (Scotland)
 – Socialist Alternative, Socialist Action, Socialist Equality Party, Freedom Socialist Party, Fourth International Caucus, Internationalist Group, Refoundation and Revolution, Spartacist League, Socialist Workers Organization, Socialist Organizer, Left Voice, Spark Revolutionary Workers League
 – Workers' Party, International Socialism; Revolutionary Workers' Party, Fourth International Posadist, Current of Workers for Socialism
 – Revolutionary Socialism, Revolutionary Marxist Current, League of Workers for Socialism
 – International Socialist Organisation

See also
List of anti-capitalist and communist parties with national parliamentary representation
List of communist parties
List of communist parties in India
List of communist parties represented in European Parliament
List of democratic socialist parties and organizations
List of democratic socialist parties that have governed
List of Labour parties
List of left and far-left parties in Europe
List of left-wing political parties
List of members of the Comintern

References

Trotskyist